Rort or RORT may refer to:

 An Australian term for fraud
 Corruption in Australia
 Tarama Airport, ICAO code RORT